Eric, stylized as  Eric, is the ninth Discworld novel by Terry Pratchett. It was originally published in 1990 as a "Discworld story", in a larger format than the other novels and illustrated by Josh Kirby. It was later reissued as a normal paperback without any illustrations, and in some cases, with the title given on the cover and title pages simply as Eric.

Plot summary 
The story is a parody of the tale of Faust, and follows the events of Sourcery in which the Wizard Rincewind was trapped in the Dungeon Dimensions.  The Discworld version of Hell or Pandemonium exists simply because some people believe that it exists for them.  In other Discworld stories, such as Small Gods, the afterlife is different or non-existent according to personal belief rather than divine judgement.

After magical disturbances occur throughout Ankh-Morpork, the wizards of Unseen University perform the Rite of AshkEnte to ask Death what is behind them; before being asked the question, Death informs them that it is Rincewind. Rincewind wakes in a strange place, having been summoned to a house in Pseudopolis by the thirteen-year-old demonologist, Eric Thursley, who wants the mastery of all kingdoms, to meet the most beautiful woman who ever existed, to live forever, and to be given a chest of gold "to be getting on with". He is disappointed when Rincewind tells him he is unable to deliver any of these things, and embarrassed when Rincewind sees through his disguise. Rincewind is disheartened to learn that the spells to confine the demon summoned are working on him; Eric's parrot tells him that because he was summoned as a demon, he is subject to the same terms.

The arrival of Rincewind's Luggage causes Eric to suspect deceit on Rincewind's part. Eric's demands are renewed; he makes three wishes of Rincewind. Rincewind insists he cannot grant wishes with the snap of his fingers, and discovers to his horror that snapping his fingers really does work.

 To be Ruler of the World.  After briefly floating above the Discworld, Eric and Rincewind find themselves in the rain forests of Klatch, in the Tezumen empire, a parody of the Aztec Empire. The local people come forward to pay tribute to Eric and declare him Ruler of the World. During this tribute, Rincewind and the parrot explore the temple of Quezovercoatl (a parody of Quetzalcoatl), where they find a prisoner, Ponce da Quirm (a parody of Juan Ponce de León), who is to be sacrificed. Da Quirm tells Rincewind about the terrible fate the Tezumen have planned for the Ruler of the World, on whom they blame all of life's misfortunes. Shortly, Rincewind, Eric and da Quirm find themselves tied up at the top of a pyramid, waiting to be sacrificed, when Quezovercoatl makes his appearance. (A junior demon, Quezovercoatl had supplanted the previous Tezumen deity, a stick, and has been reprimanded for allowing the Tezumen to kill thousands of innocent people, thus preventing them from being sent to hell, and ordered to command that the Tezumen "strive day and night to improve the lot of their fellow men".) Unfortunately for him, the Luggage also makes an appearance, trampling the six-inch-tall Quezovercoatl in the process. The Tezumen are pleased to see Quezovercoatl destroyed, release the prisoners, and enshrine the Luggage in the place of their god. At the end of the book, the Tezumen are revealed to have abandoned worshipping the Luggage as well (since it never returned) and turned atheist, "which still allowed them to kill anyone they wanted, but they didn't have to get up so early to do it".
 To Meet the Most Beautiful Woman in All History.  Rincewind snaps his fingers again, and they find themselves in a large wooden horse (a parody of the Trojan Horse). Exiting, they are surrounded by Tsortean soldiers, who take them for an Ephebian invasion force. Rincewind manages to talk their way out from the guards and out of the city, only to fall into the hands of the invading army. Rincewind and Eric are taken to Lavaeolus, the man who built the horse—having sent it in as a decoy so that he and his men could sneak in around the back while their enemies waited around the horse for them to come out—who tells them off in ironic fashion, for 'spoiling the war'. They re-enter Tsort through a secret passage, and find Elenor (a parody of Helen of Troy). Both Eric and Lavaeolus are disappointed to find that it has been a long siege, and Elenor is now a plump mother of several children, with the beginnings of a moustache, and that serious artistic licence had been taken in her description. The Ephebians escape the city while Tsort burns, and Lavaeolus and his army set out for home, with Lavaeolus complaining about voyages by sea (further reference to the Iliad and subsequent Odyssey ). Eric notes that "Lavaeolus" in Ephebian translates to "Rinser of Winds", hinting that perhaps Lavaeolus is an ancestor of Rincewind.
 To Live Forever. Rincewind snaps his fingers, bringing Eric and him outside time, just before the beginning of existence. Rincewind meets the Creator, who is just forming the Discworld and is having trouble finishing some of the animals. Out of hunger, Rincewind asks the Creator for an egg and cress sandwich, though Eric agonises over this as said sandwich may be considered a holy relic. Rincewind and Eric are left on the newly formed world, with the realisation that "to live forever" means to live for all time, from start to finish. To escape, Rincewind has Eric reverse his summoning, taking them both to hell. At the end of the book, the Creator was said to have developed a seven-pointed snowflake.

They discover hell steeped in bureaucracy, the Demon King Astfgl having decided that boredom might be the ultimate form of torture. Rincewind uses his university experience to confuse the demons, so he and Eric can try to escape. While crossing through the recently reformed levels of hell (satirical forms of Dante's Inferno) they encounter da Quirm and the parrot, as well as Lavaeolus, who tells them where the exit is.

The source of Rincewind's demonic powers is revealed to be Lord Vassenego, a Demon Lord leading a secret revolt against Astfgl. Using Rincewind to keep Astfgl occupied while gathering support amongst the demons, Vassenego confronts his king just as Astfgl finally catches up to Rincewind and Eric. Vassenego announces the council of demons has made Astfgl "Supreme Life President of Hell", and that he is to plan out the course of action for demons. With Astfgl lost in the bureaucratic prison of his own making, Vassenego takes over as king and lets Rincewind and Eric escape, so that stories about hell can be told. As they escape from hell, Rincewind and Eric notice that the path they are fleeing along has good intentions written on each cobble.

Characters

Eric Thursley, a 13-year-old demonologist who wanted to summon a demon, but ends up inadvertently rescuing Rincewind from an eternity in the Dungeon Dimensions. 
Rincewind
The Luggage

Reception
Starburst has called it "a series of hilarious pokes at the cliché that is hell". Gardner Dozois, conversely, considered it "downright bad, the only Discworld book [he] actively disliked and found a chore to read".  In 2011 The novel was included in the "Gollancz 50" series. The series marked the publisher's 50th anniversary by re-issuing seminal works of science fiction.

In other media
 An audio serialization of the novel, in four episodes of about fifteen minutes each, was broadcast on BBC Radio 4 in March 2013.

References

External links 

 
 Annotations for Eric
 Quotes from Eric
 Quotes from Wikiquote

 
 

 
 

1990 British novels
Discworld books
1990 fantasy novels
Works based on the Faust legend
Victor Gollancz Ltd books
Demon novels
Hell in popular culture
Novels about time travel
British comedy novels